Guilbert is a French surname. Notable people with the surname include:

Aimé-Victor-François Guilbert (1812–1889), French cardinal
Ann Morgan Guilbert, American actress
Georges Claude Guilbert (born 1959), French academic and writer
Nelly Guilbert (born 1979), French soccer player
René Charles Guilbert de Pixérécourt (1773–1844), French theatre director and playwright
Walter D. Guilbert (1844–1911), American politician
Yvette Guilbert, a French singer and actress

See also  
Guilbert and Betelle, an American architecture firm
Guilbert (crater), a crater on Venus
 Gilbert (disambiguation) 

French-language surnames